The Sport Slants (a.k.a. Sports Slants) and its follow-up “Sports Thrills” were a series of documentary film shorts produced by Warner Brothers and hosted by the top sports caster of the 1930s, Ted Husing.

Overview
Each black & white film ran 8 to 9 minutes in length and covered three or four topics much like a newsreel. Ted Husing was a leading announcer, with the Warner Brothers ad campaign declaring in Film Daily (May 30, 1931) that each of the initial 13 titles featured "the champions of every sport"  Bert Frank, who worked on Ripley’s Believe It or Not series for Warner, handled the editing at the Vitaphone studios in New York. 

Turner Classic Movies occasionally airs these, giving modern TV viewers a glimpse at the world of Depression Era sports.

List of films
Specific dates listed below are the Film Daily reviews, close to the time of their release.

See also
List of short subjects by Hollywood studio#Warner Brothers

Links
Film Daily links
Ted Husing film credits on IMDb.com

References
 Liebman, Roy Vitaphone Films – A Catalogue of the Features and Shorts 2003 McFarland & Company
 Motion Pictures 1912-1939 Catalog of Copyright Entries 1951 Library of Congress

Notes

Vitaphone short films
Warner Bros. short films
Documentary film series